Knoellia locipacati is a species of Gram positive, nonmotile, non-sporeforming bacteria. The bacteria are aerobic and mesophilic, and the cells can be irregular rods or coccoid. It was originally isolated from soil from the Korean Demilitarized Zone. The species name is derived from Latin locus (a place, country region) and pacatus (pacified, peaceful, quiet).

The optimum pH is 7.0-8.0, and can grow in pH 6.0-9.0.

References

Intrasporangiaceae
Bacteria described in 2012